The Rocky Hills,  el. , is a small mountain range south of Bannack, Montana in Beaverhead County, Montana.

See also
 List of mountain ranges in Montana

Notes

Mountain ranges of Montana
Landforms of Beaverhead County, Montana